Luke 'Thomas' Ockerby (born 17 May 1992) is an Australian cyclist from Ulverstone, Tasmania. Ockerby has so far won four Australian Junior Championships and many regional and interstate wheel races including the 2008 Devonport men's Wheel Race, 2009 Mersey Wheel Race and the prestigious Austral Wheel Race in 2011 and represented Australia at the 2009 Youth Olympics. Ockerby currently rides with the Tasmanian Institute of Sport (T.I.S). Also Ockerby rides off the mark of scratch in wheel races, achieving the feat at the age of 17.

Early life 
Ockerby was born in Launceston and lived a childhood of frequent relocation's. Ockerby grew up in mainly north eastern and north western Tasmania including Launceston and Exeter. He currently resides in Ulverstone Tasmania with his family.

Personal life 
Ockerby attended St Brendan-Shaw College in Devonport, Tasmania. In his spare time Ockerby enjoys playing golf and mountain bike riding. In 2006 Ockerby broke his back in a mountain biking accident and made a full recovery within a year.

2007 
 Gold - National Junior Track Championships, Sprint 
 Bronze - National Jnr Track Championships, TS, TT, Scratch

2008 
 Gold - Tasmanian Schoolboys Championship
 Gold - Tasmanian Road Championship
 Silver - Tasmanian Road TT Championship
 Bronze - Tasmanian Criterium Championship
 Silver - U17 National Track Championships, Scratch Race
 Bronze - U17 National Track Championships, TP, TT, IP

2009 
 Gold - U17 National Track Championships, Sprint

2009 
 Silver - U19 National Track Championships, Scratch Race, Omnium.

2010 
 Gold - U19 National Track Championships, Scratch Race

2011 
 Silver - Senior Track Championships, Omnium

References

1992 births
Living people
Australian male cyclists
Cyclists from Tasmania
Sportspeople from Launceston, Tasmania
People from Ulverstone, Tasmania
21st-century Australian people